Call Me Francis Tucket is the second novel in The Tucket Adventures by Gary Paulsen. Now 15, Francis Tucket is determined to return to civilization. Only a year before, he was heading west by wagon train with his family, captured by the Pawnees and rescued by a savvy, one-armed mountain man. It was published in 1995 by Random House.

It was later turned into a five-part omnibus, entitled Tucket's Travels, along with the rest of the novels in The Tucket Adventures by Random House and released in 2003.

References
Gary Paulsen - Call Me Francis Tucket

1995 American novels
Novels by Gary Paulsen